Save Our Schools was a protest movement which arose in Glasgow, Scotland, in early 2009 against the proposed closure or merger of 13 primary schools and 12 nurseries in the city.

On 3 April 2009 parents occupied Wyndford and St. Gregory's primary schools in the Wyndford area of Maryhill in the city. A rally was held there on 4 April. The parents intended to remain in occupation over the Easter holiday.

A march in support of the campaign took place in Wyndford on 9 April, which was attended by around 400 people. There was a rally at the end at Wyndford Primary School, with several speakers including Bob Doris MSP, and campaign organiser Richie Venton.

The campaign planned to hold a short march and rally in George Square on 17 April at 10 a.m., the day the council executive made its decision.

References

External links
campaign website
BBC report
BBC report on march
Scottish Television report
occupation blog

History of Glasgow
2009 in Scotland
Protests in Scotland
Politics of Glasgow
Glasgow school closures
Education in Glasgow
2000s in Glasgow